Mohammed Shahid Akhlaq (born 12 December 1969) is an Indian politician, a former member of the Indian Parliament from Meerut, Uttar Pradesh. He is a member of the Bahujan Samaj Party.

References 

Bahujan Samaj Party politicians from Uttar Pradesh
1969 births
Living people
India MPs 2004–2009
Lok Sabha members from Uttar Pradesh
Politicians from Meerut